Gumbly Simpson or Graggle is a fictional character purported to be from the American animated sitcom The Simpsons. He is the subject of an internet meme and hoax in which users online satirically claim that the character was a real member of the series' cast of characters (as well as the Simpson family) that had been removed through retroactive continuity. The intent behind the meme is to satirize the Mandela effect and its believers. The character is most commonly portrayed as a yellow, unclothed, alien-like humanoid with a large mouth and three strands of hair, commonly "seen" alongside members of the Simpson family.

Most claims made about Graggle include a backstory regarding the character's existence in the sitcom's lore. Various permutations of the story claim that he was intended to be a self-insert of The Simpsons creator Matt Groening, that he was a much-beloved character among fans, or, alternatively, that he was removed due to poor viewer reception, or that he was added late in the show's run as a way of satirizing the show's perceived decline in quality. A variety of fan works featuring Graggle have been produced, including fan art, edited cover art, screenshots and recordings of episodes of The Simpsons that include Graggle amongst other characters of the cast, and a modification for the 2003 video game The Simpsons: Hit and Run.

Origin
Although the character was expanded upon and hit viral levels of popularity in 2022, the earliest mentions of Graggle, also referred to as "Gumbly," date to 2015, when an anonymous user on the Japanese textboard 2channel added a version of the character referred to as "Nan-j min" to screenshots of The Simpsons, with Nan-j min being a mascot of the site’s /livejupiter/ textboard (nicknamed "Nan-j") at the time. The earliest references to the character in English date from early 2021 on 4chan, in a post that establishes the prior aspect of Graggle being intended as Groening’s persona, and also introducing two alternate names, "Yellow Matt" and "Weird Matt." The name "Gumbly" was likely inspired by Gumby, a claymation character who once made a cameo appearance in the seventeenth season episode "The Girl Who Slept Too Little".

References

External links
Graggle Simpson on Know Your Meme
"Who is ‘Graggle Simpson’?" fact check on Snopes.com

2015 hoaxes
2022 hoaxes
Fictional characters introduced in 2015
Internet_hoaxes
Internet memes introduced in 2022
The Simpsons
Works based on The Simpsons
Hoaxes